Thomas Linemayr (born 13 October 1960) is an Austrian businessman, the chief executive officer (CEO) of Tchibo, a German chain of coffee retailers and cafés, with over 1000 branches.

Linemayr worked for Lindt & Sprungli since 1995, and was CEO of its US business from 1999 to 2016.

In 2016, Linemayr succeeded Markus Conrad as CEO of Tchibo.

Linemayr is also a two-time Olympian for the Austrian Rowing team, finishing in the Top-10 in both the 1980 and 1984 Olympics.

References

1960 births
Living people
German businesspeople in retailing
Austrian male rowers
Olympic rowers of Austria
Rowers at the 1980 Summer Olympics
Rowers at the 1984 Summer Olympics